Dagfinn Hjertenes (August 13, 1943 in Florø – February 28, 2006) was a Norwegian politician for the Conservative Party.

He was elected to the Norwegian Parliament from Sogn og Fjordane in 1989, and sat through one term.

Hjertenes was mayor of Flora from 1979 to 1985 and 1987 to 1989, and a council member from 1975 to 1979 and 1995 to 1997. He chaired the party chapter in Askøy from 1968 to 1972, and in Flora from 1990 to 1996. From 1990 to 1992 he was a member of the Conservative Party central board.

References

1943 births
2006 deaths
Conservative Party (Norway) politicians
Members of the Storting
Mayors of places in Sogn og Fjordane
People from Flora, Norway
20th-century Norwegian politicians